Little Swan Subdivision is a hamlet in the Canadian province of Saskatchewan.

Demographics 

References

Designated places in Saskatchewan
Hudson Bay No. 394, Saskatchewan
Organized hamlets in Saskatchewan